The four stages of awakening in Early Buddhism and Theravada 
are four progressive stages culminating in full awakening (Bodhi) as an Arahant.

These four stages are Sotāpanna (stream-enterer), Sakadāgāmi (once-returner), Anāgāmi (non-returner), and Arahant. The oldest Buddhist texts portray the Buddha as referring to people who are at one of these four stages as noble people (ariya-puggala) and the community of such persons as the noble sangha (ariya-sangha).

The teaching of the four stages of awakening is a central element of the early Buddhist schools, including the Theravada school of Buddhism, which still survives.

Origins
In the Sutta Pitaka several types of Buddhist practitioners are described, according to their level of attainment. The standard is four, but there are also longer descriptions with more types. The four are the Stream-enterer, Once-returner, Non-returner and the Arahant.

In the Visuddhimagga the five stages are the culmination of the seven purifications. The descriptions are elaborated and harmonized, giving the same sequence of purifications before attaining each of the four paths and fruits.

The Visuddhimagga stresses the importance of paññā (Sanskrit: prajñā), insight into anattā (Sanskrit: anātmam) and the Buddhist teachings, as the main means to liberation. Vipassanā (Sanskrit: vipaśyanā) has a central role in this. Insight is emphasized by the contemporary Vipassana movement.

Path and Fruit
A "Stream-enterer" (Sotāpanna) is free from:
1. Identity view, the belief that there is an unchanging self or soul in the five impermanent skandhas
2. Attachment to rites and rituals
3. Doubt about the teachings

A "Once-returner" (Sakadāgāmin) has greatly attenuated:
4. Sensual desire
5. Ill will

A "Non-returner" (Anāgāmi) is free from:
4. Sensual desire
5. Ill will

An Arahant is free from all of the five lower fetters and the five higher fetters, which are:
6. Attachment to the four meditative absorptions, which have form (rupa jhana)
7.  Attachment to the four formless absorptions (ārupa jhana)
8. Conceit
9. Restlessness
10. Ignorance

The Sutta Pitaka classifies the four levels according to the levels' attainments. In the Sthaviravada and Theravada traditions, which teach that progress in understanding comes all at once, and that 'insight' (abhisamaya) does not come 'gradually' (successively – anapurva)," this classification is further elaborated, with each of the four levels described as a path to be attained suddenly, followed by the realisation of the fruit of the path.

According to the Theravada exegesis, the process of becoming an Arahat is therefore characterized by four distinct and sudden changes, although in the sutras it says that the path has a gradual development, with gnosis only after a long stretch, just as the ocean has a gradual shelf, a gradual inclination with a sudden drop only after a long stretch. The Mahasanghika had the doctrine of ekaksana-citt, "according to which a Buddha knows everything in a single thought-instant."

The ordinary person
One is reborn, lives, and dies in endless rebirths, either as a deva, human, animal, male, female, neuter, ghost, asura, hell being, or various other entities on different categories of existence.

An ordinary entity has never seen and experienced the ultimate truth of Dharma and therefore has no way of finding an end to the predicament. It is only when suffering becomes acute, or seemingly unending, that an entity looks for a "solution" to and, persisting, finds the Dharma (the ultimate solution/truth).

The four stages of attainment

The Sangha of the Tathagata's disciples (Ariya Sangha) can be described as including four or eight kinds of individuals. There are four [groups of noble disciples] when path and fruit are taken as pairs, and eight groups of individuals, when each path and fruit are taken separately:
 (1) the path to stream-entry; (2) the fruition of stream-entry;
 (3) the path to once-returning; (4) the fruition of once-returning;
 (5) the path to non-returning; (6) the fruition of non-returning;
 (7) the path to arahantship; (8) the fruition of arahantship.

Stream-enterer

The first stage is that of Sotāpanna (Pali;), literally meaning "one who enters the stream (sotas)," with the stream being the supermundane Noble Eightfold Path regarded as the highest Dharma. The stream-enterer is also said to have "opened the eye of the Dharma" (dhammacakkhu,).

A stream-enterer reaches arahantship within seven rebirths upon opening the eye of the Dharma.

Once-returner

The once-returner will at most return to the realm of the senses (the lowest being human and the highest being the devas wielding power over the creations of others) one more time. Both the stream-enterer and the once-returner have abandoned the first three fetters. The stream-enterer and once-returner are distinguished by the fact that the once-returner has weakened lust, hate, and delusion to a greater degree. The once-returner therefore has fewer than seven rebirths. Once-returners do not have only one more rebirth, as the name suggests, for that may not even be said with certainty about the non-returner who can take multiple rebirths in the five "Pure Abodes". They do, however, only have one more rebirth in the realm of the senses, excluding, of course, the planes of hell, animals and hungry ghosts.

Non-returner

The non-returner, having overcome sensuality, does not return to the human world, or any unfortunate world lower than that, after death. Instead, non-returners are reborn in one of the five special worlds in Rūpadhātu called the  worlds, or "Pure Abodes", and there attain ; Pāli: Nibbana; some of them are reborn a second time in a higher world of the Pure Abodes.

An  has abandoned the five lower fetters, out of ten total fetters, that bind beings to the cycle of rebirth. An  is well-advanced.

Arahant

The fourth stage is that of Arahant (Sanskrit: Arhat), a fully awakened person. They have abandoned all ten fetters and, upon death (Sanskrit: ,) will never be reborn in any plane or world, having wholly escaped . An Arahant has attained awakening by following the path given by the Buddha. In Theravada Buddhism the term Buddha is reserved for ones who "self-enlighten" such as Siddhartha Gautama Buddha, who discovered the path by himself.

Notes

References

Sources

External links
 Mahasi Sayadaw, '' The Progress of Insight (Visuddhiñana-katha)
 Bodhiketu, Stages of the Path: Stream Entry and Beyond  
 Introducing Buddhist Abhidhamma: Part 13 - Noble Ones
 Stages of Enlightenment & the Notion of 'I', 'Mine', 'Myself'

Stage theories
Buddhist stages of enlightenment